State Route 155 (SR 155) is a  state highway that travels south-to-north through portions of Spalding, Henry, Rockdale, and DeKalb counties in the north-central part of the U.S. state of Georgia.

Route description

Spalding County

SR 155 begins at an intersection with US 19/US 41/SR 3/SR 7 south of Griffin, in Spalding County. This also marks the southern terminus of US 19 Bus./US 41 Bus., which travel concurrently with SR 155 to the northeast to an intersection with SR 16 in the central part of the city. They cross a Norfolk Southern Railway until SR 155 departs to the east. It heads northeast, and turns north on McDonough Road. It heads northward and enters Henry County.

Henry and Rockdale Counties
SR 155 meets Interstate 75 (I-75), just before it enters McDonough. In the city, it intersects US 23/SR 42. In the main part of the city is SR 20. The two highways travel concurrently for about a block. Then, SR 81 travels concurrent with it for a short distance. SR 155 departs to the north, and intersects SR 138 just before it reaches the Henry–Rockdale county line. It travels along the county line until just past Panola Mountain State Park, where it re-enters Henry County for a short distance. After that, it enters DeKalb County.

DeKalb County

SR 155 continues to the north-northwest to Snapfinger and turns west on Flat Shoals Parkway. It curves to the northwest and has an interchange with I-285 on the southeastern edge of Panthersville. The highway heads through Panthersville and meets I-20 on the northeast edge of it. In the East Lake neighborhood, it intersects SR 154. In Decatur, it has a brief concurrency with US 278/SR 10. In the northwest part of Decatur is US 23/US 29/SR 8. East of North Druid Hills is an intersection with SR 236. On the North Druid Hills–Brookhaven city line is an interchange with I-85. SR 155 curves to the northeast to meet its northern terminus, an intersection with US 23/SR 13, south of Chamblee.

Major intersections

See also

References

External links

 
 Georgia Roads (Routes 141 - 160)
 Georgia State Route 155 on State-Ends.com

155
Transportation in Spalding County, Georgia
Transportation in Henry County, Georgia
Transportation in Rockdale County, Georgia
Transportation in DeKalb County, Georgia